Afro-Harping is an album by jazz harpist Dorothy Ashby recorded in 1968 and released on the Cadet label.

Reception

Ron Wynn, in his review for Allmusic, calls the album "the best and most complete album done by jazz harpist (a rare style) Dorothy Ashby... She turned the harp into a lead instrument, and offered solos that were as tough and memorable as those done by any reed, brass, or percussion player.

A reviewer of Dusty Groove mentioned "One of the grooviest records ever – a sublime blend of African percussion, soulful orchestrations, and Dorothy Ashby's amazing electric harp! By the time of this landmark album, Dorothy had been knocking around the jazz world for a number of years, but it wasn't until she hooked up with Richard Evans at Cadet Records that her sound really began to cook – breaking down genres and expectations in the trademark style of the best late 60s sides from the Chicago underground. The record's got a bit of funk, a bit of jazz, and a heck of a lot of soul – and the setting works perfectly for Dorothy's harp, giving it a lot more room to work around than some of her smaller jazz combo albums".

Track listing 
All compositions by Dorothy Ashby except as indicated
 "Soul Vibrations" (Richard Evans) - 3:22     
 "Games" - 3:57     
 "Action Line" - 3:43     
 "Lonely Girl" (Redd Evans, Neal Hefti, Jay Livingston) - 3:15     
 "Life Has Its Trials" - 4:31     
 "Afro-Harping" (Dorothy Ashby, Phil Upchurch) - 3:01     
 "Little Sunflower" (Freddie Hubbard) - 3:47     
 "Valley of the Dolls" (André Previn, Dory Previn) - 3:35     
 "Come Live With Me" (Russ Carlyle, Mike Caranda, Ivan Washabaugh) - 2:39     
 "The Look of Love" (Burt Bacharach, Hal David) - 4:06

Personnel 
Dorothy Ashby - harp
Unidentified orchestra arranged and conducted by Richard Evans

References

External links
Review on Allaboutjazz.com
A Dorothy Ashby Discography

Dorothy Ashby albums
1968 albums
Cadet Records albums
Jazz-funk albums